Ranunculus luminarius is a species of flowering plant in the family Ranunculaceae, native to Italy. It is a member of the Ranunculus auricomus complex.

References

luminarius
Endemic flora of Italy
Plants described in 1989